Hymenobacter arizonensis  is a rod-shaped and non-motile bacterium from the genus of Hymenobacter which has been isolated from biological soil crusts at the Colorado Plateau in the United States.

References

Further reading

External links
Type strain of Hymenobacter arizonensis at BacDive -  the Bacterial Diversity Metadatabase	

arizonensis
Bacteria described in 2013